USS Retaliation was the French privateer Croyable, built in Maryland, that then operated out of Santo Domingo.  captured her on 7 July 1798 off New Jersey. She then served in the United States Navy during Quasi-War with France. Two French frigates recaptured her on 20 November 1798. The French Navy took her into service as Magicienne. However,  captured her on 28 June 1799. She served in the US Navy in the Caribbean briefly, before arriving in Philadelphia in August. She was paid off there and sold on 29 November.

Career
The U.S. warship Delaware, commanded by Capt. Stephen Decatur Sr., was able to capture the French privateer, Croyable, off Great Egg Harbor Bay, New Jersey, on 7 July 1798. Before her capture, Croyable  had been preying upon shipping off the Delaware Capes and had taken a British brigantine and a Philadelphia merchantman, Liberty. She had also boarded and robbed the coaster Alexander Hamilton, whose captain had informed Decatur of Croyables whereabouts. Decatur brought Croyable to Fort Mifflin in the Delaware River. She was the first American capture of the undeclared war.

The U.S. Navy purchased Croyable on 30 July 1798, manned her at Philadelphia, renamed her Retaliation, and placed her under the command of Lt. William Bainbridge.

On 20 November, a pair of French frigates, Insurgente and Volontaire, overtook Retaliation while her consorts were away on a chase and forced Bainbridge to surrender the hopelessly out-gunned schooner. However, even as a prisoner, the American officer managed to serve his country. He saved Montezuma and Norfolk by convincing the senior French commander that those American warships were too powerful for his frigates and induced him to abandon the chase.

Renamed Magicienne by the French, the schooner again came into American hands on 28 June 1799, when a broadside from USS Merrimack forced her to haul down her colors. She performed convoy duty in the Caribbean before returning to Philadelphia in August. Her crew was then discharged and the schooner was sold on 29 November 1799 to Thomas and Peter Mackie.

Citations and references
Citations

References
Hamilton, Alexander (1974) The Papers of Alexander Hamilton: April 1797-July 1798. Vol. 21. (Columbia University Press).
Winfield, Rif & Stephen S Roberts (2015) French Warships in the Age of Sail 1786 - 1861: Design Construction, Careers and Fates. (Seaforth Publishing). 

1790s ships
Privateer ships of France
Schooners of the United States Navy
Quasi-War ships of the United States
Captured ships
Ships of the French Navy